Gibberula evadne is a species of sea snail, a marine gastropod mollusk, in the family Cystiscidae.

References

evadne
Gastropods described in 1901
Cystiscidae